Jarkko Hattunen is a Finnish ice hockey player who currently plays professionally in Finland for TPS of the SM-liiga.

References

External links

Living people
HC TPS players
1987 births
Podhale Nowy Targ players
Finnish ice hockey forwards
People from Kajaani
Sportspeople from Kainuu